The following are the association football events of the year 1883 throughout the world.

Events

Clubs founded

England
Andover
Ashington
Belper Town
Buckingham Town
Bourne Town FC
Bognor Regis Town
Bristol Rovers
Coventry City
Darlington
Gloucester City
Stockport County
Thame United F.C.

Netherlands
FC Dordrecht

Domestic cups

Births
 15 January – James Stewart (d. 1958), England international forward in three matches (1907–1911), scoring two goals.
 25 February – Herbert Burgess (d. 1954), England international full-back in four matches (1904–1906).
 29 July – Fred Pentland (d. 1962), England international forward in five matches (1909).
 23 August – Jesse Pennington (d. 1970), England international full-back in 25 matches (1907–1920).
 8 September – George Wilson (d. 1960), Scotland international forward in six matches (1904–1909).
 2 November – Evelyn Lintott (d. 1916), England international half-back in seven matches (1908–1909).
 14 December – Dicky Bond (d. 1955), England international forward in eight matches (1905–1910), scoring two goals.
 26 December – Alec McNair (d. 1951), Scotland international full-back in fifteen matches (1906–1920).

References

 
Association football by year